Saman Pathak, a politician from Communist Party of India (Marxist), is a Member of the Parliament of India representing West Bengal in the Rajya Sabha, the upper house of the Indian Parliament.

External links
 Profile on Rajya Sabha website

Communist Party of India (Marxist) politicians from West Bengal
Year of birth missing (living people)
Living people
Rajya Sabha members from West Bengal
Communist Party of India (Marxist) candidates in the 2014 Indian general election